Juan Carlos Silva Suárez (born 15 January 1989) is a Uruguayan footballer who plays as a defender. He is currently a free agent.

Career
Silva started his career in 2006 with Juventud. He remained until 2012 after twenty-three appearances over seasons in the Uruguayan Primera División and the Uruguayan Segunda División. During his Juventud career, Silva was loaned out twice to Primera División teams. In 2007, Silva joined Bella Vista and made four appearances. In 2009, Silva signed for Central Español but failed to feature; though was an unused substitute once in December 2010 against Danubio. He departed Juventud in 2012 and, in 2013, subsequently joined Tacuarembó of the Segunda División. He made just one appearance for Tacuarembó.

References

External links

1989 births
Living people
Footballers from Montevideo
Uruguayan footballers
Association football defenders
Uruguayan Primera División players
Uruguayan Segunda División players
Juventud de Las Piedras players
C.A. Bella Vista players
Central Español players
Tacuarembó F.C. players